Andy Fang (born 1992) is a Chinese-American billionaire tech entrepreneur. He is best known as the co-founder and Chief Technology Officer at DoorDash, which he started along with Stanley Tang, Tony Xu and Evan Moore in 2013.

DoorDash had its IPO in December 2020, making Fang's net worth an estimated $2.2 billion as of December 2020.

Personal life and education
Fang grew up in the San Francisco Bay Area where he attended The Harker School, graduating in 2010. Fang has a bachelor's degree in Computer Science from Stanford University.

References 

1992 births
American billionaires
American technology company founders
Living people
Stanford University alumni